Nizhneosinovsky is a rural locality (a khutor) and the administrative center of Nizhneosinovskoye Rural Settlement, Surovikinsky District, Volgograd Oblast, Russia. The population was 750 as of 2010.

Geography 
Nizhneosinovsky is located north from A-260 Track, 8 km northwest of Surovikino (the district's administrative centre) by road. Surovikino is the nearest rural locality.

References 

Rural localities in Surovikinsky District